Oscar Boone  (March 28, 1911 – October 12, 1958), nicknamed "The San Angelo Sheepherder", was an American baseball catcher in the Negro leagues. 

A native of Cameron, Texas, Boone played with the Atlanta Black Crackers and Baltimore Elite Giants in 1939 and the Chicago American Giants in 1941. He died in Eloy, Arizona in 1958 at age 47.

References

External links
 and Seamheads 

Atlanta Black Crackers players
Baltimore Elite Giants players
Chicago American Giants players
1911 births
1958 deaths
Baseball catchers
Baseball players from Texas